Highway 970 is a provincial highway in the north-east region of the Canadian province of Saskatchewan. It runs from the Highway 265 / Highway 926 intersection near Clearsand Lake north to a dead end near Gaire Lake. 

Highway 970 is about 15 km (9 mi) long.

See also
Roads in Saskatchewan
Transportation in Saskatchewan

References

970